Ritonia is a genus of flowering plants belonging to the family Acanthaceae.

Its native range is Madagascar.

Species:

Ritonia barbigera 
Ritonia humbertii 
Ritonia rosea

References

Acanthaceae
Acanthaceae genera